Pætur Dam Jacobsen (born 5 December 1982) is a Faroese international footballer who plays for Skála, as a midfielder.

Career
Born in Tórshavn, Jacobsen has played club football for Havnar Bóltfelag, Argja Bóltfelag, Skála and EB/Streymur.

He made his international debut for Faroe Islands in 2008.

References

1982 births
Living people
People from Tórshavn
Faroese footballers
Faroe Islands international footballers
Havnar Bóltfelag players
Argja Bóltfelag players
EB/Streymur players
Skála ÍF players
Faroe Islands Premier League players
Association football midfielders